Veronica Logan (also known as Veronika Logan) is an Italian film and television actress.

Biography
Born to the British musician Michael Logan and Antonella Desimone, she started working as a model. On television she made her debut in 1984 in I Ragazzi Della Valle Misteriosa, directed by Marcello Aliprandi, along with Kim Rossi Stuart, and continued with a variety of television and film productions, until the successful Canale 5 soap opera Vivere from 1999 to 2006, playing the role of Chiara Bonelli. In 1991, she played the part of the Witch and the Countess in the board game Atmosfear, episode 3 and 4. In 1991, she participated in the Jocelyn programme on Canale 5 Cos'è Cos'è?; in 1992, in well-known television programmes on RAI. She has performed in comic films such as A Spasso Nel Tempo (1996), and in romantic roles such as that in I Ragazzi Del Muretto (1991), to ambiguous roles in TV series like Strangers (1996), where she performs completely naked in love scenes with the forty-five-year-old Cherie Lunghi, up to popular TV series roles like Un medico in famiglia (1998). Her other works include the films La verità vi prego sull'amore (2001), directed by Francesco Apolloni, and Scusa ma ti chiam amore (2008), directed by Federico Moccia, besides the TV series L'ispettore Coliandro (2006- in progress). In 2013 she participated in the talent show Ballando con le stelle, conducted by Milly Carlucci, paired with the Cuban dancer Maykel Fonts: provisionally eliminated during the seventh episode of the reality, she was decisively eliminated in the next episode dedicated to the repechage.

Private life
She was romantically linked to the actor Kim Rossi Stuart, to Alberto Ferrari of Verdena, and had a daughter with the producer Vittorio Mango. On the set of the series The Young Indiana Jones Chronicles, she met the actor Sean Patrick Flanery, with whom she cohabited for a period in Los Angeles.

Filmography

Films

Television

References

External links

Living people
Actresses from Rome
Italian television actresses
Italian film actresses
1969 births
Italian people of Irish descent